The 1976–77 UC Irvine Anteaters men's basketball team represented the University of California, Irvine during the 1976–77 NCAA Division II men's basketball season. The Anteaters were led by eight year head coach Tim Tift and played their home games at Crawford Hall. The anteaters finished the season with an overall record of 10–17 and were not invited to a post season tournament.

Previous season
The 1975–76 UC Irvine Anteaters men's basketball team finished the season with an overall record of 14–12 and did not receive a post season tournament invitation.

Roster

Schedule

|-
!colspan=9 style=|Regular Season

Source

References

UC Irvine Anteaters men's basketball seasons
UC Irvine Anteaters
UC Irvine Anteaters